The Second League was restructured reducing number of zones from 9 to 3 due to withdrawals by clubs from Estonia, Georgia, Latvia (except Pardaugava Riga, a majority-Russian club) and Lithuania as they declared independence from the Soviet Union.

Final standings

West

Representation
 : 11
  4
 : 3
  2
 : 1
  1

Center

Representation
  20
  2

East

Representation

 : 7
  7
 : 5
 : 1
 : 1
 : 1

References
 All-Soviet Archive Site
 Results. RSSSF

Soviet Second League seasons
3
Soviet
Soviet
1990 in Russian football
1990 in Armenian football
1990 in Belarusian football
1990 in Kazakhstani football
1990 in Latvian football
1990 in Tajikistani football
1990 in Turkmenistani sport
1990 in Ukrainian association football leagues
1990 in Uzbekistani football
1 
1
1 
1 
1990 in Kyrgyzstani football